Inanidrilus belizensis is a species of annelid worm. It is known from subtidal coral sands in Belize, in the Caribbean Sea.

References

belizensis
Invertebrates of Central America
Fauna of the Caribbean
Taxa named by Christer Erséus
Animals described in 1984